Altınyazı is a village in Mucur, Kırşehir Province, Turkey. The population is around 220.

Etymology

The old name of Altınyazı was Aflak and it came from an old Seljukid general, who died there.

History

The village was founded about 2,000 years ago. Sometimes the village has been destroyed and been refounded. There is also an old church built in the year 300 by the Byzantines. The village also has an ancient underground city.

Geography

Altınyazı is in a steppe called bozkır. It is also very mountainous. Ağa tepe and Kızlar tepesi are the two highest peaks in Altınyazı.

Climate

The summers are hot and dry and the winters are cold.

Education

There is no school in Altınyazı.

Transport

Altınyazı is 29 km away from Kırşehir, 8 km from Mucur and 220 km from Ankara.

Villages in Mucur District